Mark Sandau (born June 13, 1967) is an interactive creative director and entrepreneur. He is the founder of Sandau Creative Inc. located in Minneapolis, Minnesota. He is currently a partner at Ditch Creative Inc., also in Minneapolis. He has worked with CKS Partners in Cupertino, California, and Fallon McElligott and Duffy Design in Minneapolis.  While at Fallon he worked on both seasons of BMW's ground-breaking digital film series, The Hire. He is also the author of Atom and the Time Capsule.

Throughout his career Sandau has worked closely with software company Macromedia, often working with Flash and Director.

Sandau received The One Club's Best of the Digital Decade award in 2010 for his work while at Fallon, a 2003 Apple Design Award for Best QuickTime Content, and is credited in the Clio Awards. Other recognition includes 13 awards from the One Club, including two Best In Show, as well as from the Minneapolis AIGA.

References

Businesspeople from Minneapolis
Interactive television producers
1967 births
Living people